Olena Anatoliivna Bondarenko (née Kovalenko) is a Ukrainian journalist, a former People's Deputy of the Verkhovna Rada of Ukraine, 1st Deputy Chairman of the Committee of Verkhovna Rada on freedom of speech and information; Head of Subcommittee of Television and Radio Broadcasting Committee of the Verkhovna Rada of Ukraine on freedom of speech and information. Member of the Party of Regions grouping between May 2006 and 2014. In 2012 she was re-elected into parliament on the party list of Party of Regions. Bondarenko did not participate in the 2014 Ukrainian parliamentary election. And in the 2019 Ukrainian parliamentary election, she lost in Mykolayiv Oblast’s District 131, with 8% of the votes.

Biography

Bondarenko was born on 26 May 1974, in Makiivka, Donetsk oblast', her father is a miner, and her mother is a nurse.

Education
In 1991, Bondarenko entered Donetsk State University, Department of History.  When at the third year, she entered the Faculty of related and complementary disciplines, with a qualification in journalism. In 1996, she graduated from both faculties. 
In 2004, Olena Bondarenko graduated from the Department of Administrative Management, Donetsk State Academy of Management.

Career
 1994-1995 - writer for the weekly "Donetsk News"
 1995-1998 - editor of the information service at "Ukraine" TV channel
 1998 - journalist at "Inter-Seal" TV channel, Donetsk regional office of "Inter" TV channel During this time she implemented two of her own  projects: the weekly review of political activities in the region "Labyrinths Of Politics" and "Political Chronicles".
 1998-2001 - editor of the information service at "New Donbass" TV channel
 April - September 2001 - Director of Communications at Donetsk Regional Organization of Party of Greens
 2002-2006 - Director of press service of Donetsk Regional Council

Co-working with Borys Kolesnikov, who in 2003 headed the Donetsk regional branch of Party of Regions, predetermined further political career of Bondarenko. She not only became the personal media consultant for Boris Kolesnikov, but also was one of the key players in the team. She managed to create an effective press service and ensure smooth communication between People's Deputies and Kolesnikov and the media.

Activities related to Verkhovna Rada

 May 2005-April 2006 - assistant-consultant to the People's Deputy of Ukraine
 May 2006-November 2007 - People's Deputy of the 5th convocation of Verkhovna Rada of Ukraine, elected from the Party of Regions, No. 125 in the list. At that time she was the 1st Vice-Chairman of the Committee on freedom of speech and information (since July 2006); Chairman of the Subcommittee of the Advertising Committee on freedom of speech and information (since July 2006), fraction member of the Party of Regions (since May 2006). Bondarenko was a member of the temporary investigatory commission to investigate the death of Georgy Gongadze and to check facts of corruption and abuse of power by some Ministry of Internal Affairs officers. Her major legislative initiatives related to basic laws: the law on advertising, the law on television and radio, and the law about the National Council on Television and Radio. Bondarenko criticized the National Council on public as saw the acts of abuses and illegal actions in its activities, and even initiated a special Verkhovna Rada inquiry commission.
 since November 2007 - People's Deputy of the 6th convocation of Verkhovna Rada of Ukraine, elected from the Party of Regions, No. 146 in the list.
During parliamentary elections in 2007, Bondarenko led the Department of Communications of the central campaign office of the Party of Regions. Since December 2007 she's been the member of the Committee on freedom of speech and information, Party of Regions faction member since November 2007, member of Ukrainian National Union of Journalists, member of the Party of Regions.

In 2012, she was re-elected into parliament on the party list of Party of Regions.

Bondarenko did not participate in the 2014 Ukrainian parliamentary election. And in the 2019 Ukrainian parliamentary election, she lost in Mykolayiv Oblast’s District 131, with 8% of the votes.

Criticism

In January 2014, a deleted Facebook comment of Myroslava Gongadze claimed she was banned from entering the United States again.

Bondarenko has been the topic of increased concern with regards to human rights in Ukraine. After a special session of parliament on January 29, 2014, Bondarenko agreed to an interview during which activists gathered around her showing various pictures of journalists who were either beaten or murdered by police during the protests in Kiev. After being asked whether she was saddened by the violence, Bondarenko coldly responded that journalist are in a zone of war and quickly left the room.

On 10 September 2014, she wrote a testimonial about the alarming situation of human rights of the opposition in Ukraine

Family
 husband Andriy Bondarenko (b. 1969) was in 2010-2012 the Vice-Minister of Ukraine of Emergencies
 daughter Polina (b. 1999) and son Mikhail (born in 2010)

References

External links 
 Olena Bondarenko's profile at the official Verkhovna Rada web portal

See also 
2007 Ukrainian parliamentary election
List of Ukrainian Parliament Members 2007
Party of Regions

1974 births
Living people
People from Makiivka
Party of Regions politicians
Fifth convocation members of the Verkhovna Rada
Sixth convocation members of the Verkhovna Rada
Seventh convocation members of the Verkhovna Rada
Pro-government people of the Euromaidan
Donetsk National University alumni
Donetsk State University of Management alumni
21st-century Ukrainian women politicians
Women members of the Verkhovna Rada